Harttia tuna is a species of catfish in the family Loricariidae. It is native to South America, where it occurs in the upper Paru de Oeste River basin in Suriname. The species reaches 17.2 cm (6.8 inches) in standard length. It is known to be very morphologically similar to the related species Harttia fluminensis. Its specific name, tuna, is derived from the Tiriyó language and roughly translates to "river".

References 

Fish of Suriname
Fish described in 2012
tuna
Catfish of South America